Events in the year 1680 in Norway.

Incumbents
Monarch: Christian V

Events
May - Peder Griffenfeld  was imprisoned at Munkholmen, outside of Trondheim.

Arts and literature

Births
20 December - Anders Daae, priest and landowner (died 1763)

Around 1680
Lorentz Reichwein, military officer (died 1735)

Deaths
29 December - Arent Berntsen, topographical-statistical author, businessman, banker, estate owner and councillor (born 1610)

See also

References